The Poet and the Little Mother is a 1959 Danish family film directed by Erik Balling and starring Henning Moritzen. It was entered into the 9th Berlin International Film Festival.

Cast
 Henning Moritzen as Poeten
 Helle Virkner as Lillemor
 Ove Sprogøe as Anton
 Lis Løwert as Vera
 Olaf Ussing as Kreditoren
 Dirch Passer as Bageren
 Karl Stegger as Slagteren
 Valsø Holm as Købmanden
 Helga Frier as Købmandens kone
 Kjeld Petersen as Henry Hamber
 Judy Gringer as Lise
 Paul Hagen as Postbudet
 Axel Strøbye as Landmåleren
 Ole Mogens as Sangeren
 Henry Lohmann
 Bjørn Spiro
 Jytte Abildstrøm

References

External links
 

1959 films
1950s Danish-language films
Danish black-and-white films
Films directed by Erik Balling
Films with screenplays by Erik Balling
Films based on Danish comics
Live-action films based on comics